Bhaarat Today is a 24-hour Telugu Devotional and Entertainment Channel in India.

Inauguration 
Bhaarat Today is a Telugu language T V channel. It was inaugurated on 29 August 2015. The inauguration event was conducted at Shilpa Kalaa Vedika, Hyderabad, Telangana and was presided over by Swami Paripoornaananda Saraswati, founder of Sripeetham, a center for vedic learning. The channel logo was released by TV5 (India) Chairman B. R. Naidu. Nagarjuna Industry's Group Chairman K. V. K. Raju was felicitated in the event. The channel's editorial team consists of experienced media professionals, B. Vijay Kumar, Valleeswar and R. V. Krishna Rao.

Channel  
Bhaarat Today channel telecasts hourly news bulletins and newstrack shows backed up by news reporters spread out in the twin Telugu states of Andhra Pradesh and Telangana, covering events, films and the entertainment world. It also telecasts special documentaries on events, history, culture, films and entertainment.

Online 

Bhaarat Today Telugu News is streamed live online on YuppTV in North America.

References

External links
 Bhaarat Today website
 Live streaming of Bhaarat today
 Youtube address
Bhaarat Today Live streaming

Telugu-language television channels
24-hour television news channels in India
Television channels and stations established in 2016
Television stations in Hyderabad